Flight 548 may refer to:

Sabena Flight 548, crashed in 1961 approaching Brussels Airport 
British European Airways Flight 548, crashed in 1972 after takeoff from Heathrow, London 

0548